Wislouchia is a genus of chlorophyte green algae. The name was first published in 2021, as a replacement name for Raciborskiella. , it was the only genus in the family Wislouchiaceae.

The genus synonym name of Raciborskiella was in honour of Marjan (Mariyan) Raciborski (1863-1917), who was a Polish botanist (Mycology,
Algology and Bryology), plant collector and Palaeontologist, Professor of Botany at Lemberg University (Ukraine) in 1909. It was named by botanist Stanislav Michailovic Wislouch (1875-1927), who the new genus is named after.

References

External links

Chlamydomonadales genera
Chlamydomonadales